Kameni may refer to:

 Carlos Kameni (born 1984), Cameroonian football player
 Mathurin Kameni (born 1978), Cameroonian football player
 Nea Kameni ('New Kameni'), an island of Greece
 Palaia Kameni ('Old Kameni'), an island of Greece